Two ships of the Royal Navy have borne the name HMS Shakespeare, after poet and playwright William Shakespeare:

  was a Thornycroft type flotilla leader launched in 1917.
  was an S-class submarine launched in 1941 and sold in 1946.

Royal Navy ship names